Youree Henley is a film producer. On at least two projects (20th Century Women in 2016 and Kajillionaire in 2020), he has been affiliated with Annapurna Pictures.

His productions have included:
 A Glimpse Inside the Mind of Charles Swan III (2012)
 Len and Company (2015)
 20th Century Women (2016)
 The Beguiled (2017)
 A Beautiful Day in the Neighborhood (2019)
 The Lighthouse (2019)
 Kajillionaire (2020)
 On the Rocks (2020)
 Operation Varsity Blues: The College Admissions Scandal (2021)
 Priscilla (film) TBA

He has also been co-producing the suspended film project for the uncompleted film Being Mortal'' (starring Aziz Ansari, who has also been co-producing).

References 

American film producers
Living people
Year of birth missing (living people)